Danka Kovinić was the defending champion, but chose to participate in Rome instead.

Kateřina Siniaková won the title, defeating Anastasija Sevastova in the final, 7–6(7–4), 5–7, 6–0.

Seeds

Main draw

Finals

Top half

Bottom half

References 
 Main draw

Empire Slovak Open - Singles